Yaksik or yakbap (literally "medicinal food" or "medicinal rice") is a sweet Korean dish made by steaming glutinous rice, and mixing with chestnuts, jujubes, and pine nuts. It is seasoned with honey or brown sugar, sesame oil, soy sauce, and sometimes cinnamon. It is traditionally eaten on Jeongwol Daeboreum (정월대보름), a Korean holiday which falls on every January 15 in the lunar calendar, but also for weddings and hwangap festivities.

Etymology
Yaksik got its name due to the use of honey in its ingredients. According to the etymology book A-eon Gakbi (hangul:아언각비, hanja:雅言覺非) written in early 19th century Joseon, it is noted that honey was commonly called as yak (medicine).  Thus honey buckwheat wine was called yakju (약주), honey rice was called yakban (약반, old word for yaksik), and fried honey ricecake was called yakgwa (약과).

History
Records of yaksik can be found in Samguk Yusa, written in the 13th century. According to the legend entitled Sageumgap (사금갑), King Soji the 21st ruler of Silla headed on a journey to Cheoncheonjeong in the 10th year of his reign. on the 15th of January, 488, when a crow and mouse alerted him of danger. The mouse spoke to King Soji in his native language telling him to follow the crow. The King of Silla ordered a servant to follow the crow which took him to a pond. It was here where an old man rose out from the pond handing the servant an envelope. Written on the envelope was “Two people will die if you open this. If you don’t open it, only one person will die.” After being informed by his servant that the envelope was in direct reference to the king, The King of Silla opened the envelope. Inside the envelope was a letter with the writing, “Go back to the palace and shoot an arrow into the box that holds a six-stringed zither”. The King of Silla complied, he shot an arrow into the box discovering a monk and concubine awaiting to assassinate the king (Korean recipes: Sweet rice with nuts and jujubes, yaksik (약식), 2016). The King saved himself from a potential revolt thanks to the crow's warning and the day of January 15 was designated as a day of remembrance thereafter. Originally, this day was known as Ogiil. Glutinous rice was put up as an offering to the crows as a way to give thanks for saving King Silla’s life during the commemorative rites, which became the origin of yaksik. Although, there are many variations of this legend passed on through the South Korean people, such as a tale consisting of the Suh family. The legend of Sageumgap is the most known.

The adding of pine nuts, chestnuts, jujubes, honey, and oil were added in the Goryeo era. Yaksik is also mentioned in various books from the Joseon period such as Dongguksesigi (Record of Seasonal Customs in Korea) (동국세시기), Yeolyang Seisigi (열양세시기), Donggukyeojiseungram (동국여지승람). In Yeolyang Seisigi, it is said that envoys to China shared yaksik with the people in Yeonkyung, and most enjoyed the dish. It is also said that Heo Guyn a politician, poet, scholar and writer annotated in his book Domundaejak that the Chinese people loved yakban; known to them as Goryeoban. From the Gyuhap Chongseo, (규합총, Women’s Encyclopedia, 1809) It is important to note that although this dish was shared with neighboring China, the consumption of yaksik on the first lunar month is a traditional custom specific to Korea.

Cooking
Glutinous rice is steamed and mixed with honey, brown sugar, and ganjang to colorize the rice. Soft-boiled chestnuts, pine nuts, sesame oil and quartered jujubes with the seeds removed are added to this mixture with the entire mix is resteamed. The yaksik is then put into desired shapes such as flat squares and left to cool before eating. Over time, South Koreans have developed more modernized ways of cooking yaksik such as utilizing a rice pressure cooker. Yaksik is typically eaten at room temperature and can be kept in cooler conditions for about a few days. For longer periods of storing, keep in the refrigerator or freezer.

Gastronomic Culture
In Korean culture the idea of Yak Sik Dong Won(약식동원,藥食同源) is commonly believed. This idea describes that health treatment begins with healthy foods then medical treatment if there is no improvement. This belief also emphasizes a common practice that food is not eaten to become full, rather to be consumed for health reasons such as disease prevention. The Korean Gastronomic culture has been developing for hundreds of years and scientific findings concur that preparation and ingredients has proven most Korean foods to be healthy (Oktay & Ekinci, 2019).

Yaksik is commonly believed among South Koreans to be beneficial to those undergoing digestive problems and frequent heartburn. Another ingredient in yaksik, Jujube is believed to aid with nervous tension, anxiety and insomnia. The Chestnuts in yaksik contain important vitamins C and Bs that improve ailments such as diarrhea.

See also
Daeboreum
Namul
Songpyeon

References

 Yaksik at Doosan Encyclopedia
 Yaksik at Digital Gangneung Culture Almanac
 Yaksik at Korean Culture Encyclopedia

External links
Recipe: Yaksik (Sweet Rice with Nuts & Jujubes) at The Seattle Times, 2006-01-04
Yaksik, tasty and healthy treat, Paik Jae-Eun, Professor of Food & Nutrition, Bucheon University. Koreana magazine Winter 2008.

Korean cuisine
Glutinous rice dishes